Belfast City Rockets (BCR)  is a roller derby league based in Belfast, Northern Ireland. The league was founded in 2012 and is a member of the Irish Roller Derby Association. In addition, the league is affiliated with Queen's University Belfast and has many student members.

The league was dissolved in 2018 and merged with Belfast Roller Derby to create one league for the city.

References

Sport at Queen's University Belfast
Roller derby leagues in Ireland
Roller derby leagues in the United Kingdom
Roller derby leagues established in 2012
2012 establishments in Northern Ireland